The Slivna is a left tributary of the river Chineja in Romania. It flows into the Chineja in Moscu.

References

Rivers of Romania
Rivers of Galați County
Tributaries of the Chineja